Nocturnal (1961) for soprano, male choir, and orchestra, is a musical composition by Edgard Varèse with text consisting of syllables by Varèse and words and phrases adapted from House of Incest by Anaïs Nin (1936), revised and completed posthumously by Chou Wen-chung (1968), The piece is commissioned by and dedicated to the Koussevitzky Music Foundation, published 1972. It includes music for flexatone and two ondes Martenots. The use of Dada-like "meta-language" in Ecuatorial and in Nocturnal was suggested by Antonin Artaud. The premier was conducted by Robert Craft at The Town Hall in New York on May 1, 1961.

References

1961 compositions
1972 compositions
Compositions by Edgard Varèse
Modernist compositions
Music commissioned by Serge Koussevitzky or the Koussevitzky Music Foundation
Compositions for orchestra
Vocal musical compositions
Musical compositions completed by others